LøVë is the name of two releases by Aaron Carter:

Love (Aaron Carter EP), 2017
Love (Aaron Carter album), 2018